Benaocaz is a village located in the province of Cádiz, Spain. According to the 2006 census, the city has a population of 729 inhabitants.

The town's name dates back to the Moors, and derives from The Arabic Ocaz family, with ‘Ben’ meaning “son of”. In the upper part of the town, Moorish and 8th century ruins are evident.

Declared an historic site, the village includes the Aznalmara castle which dates to the 13th and 14th centuries.

Demographics

Sights of Benaocaz

References

External links 

Benaocaz - Sistema de Información Multiterritorial de Andalucía

Municipalities of the Province of Cádiz